The John Rogers House, built in 1761, is a historic home believed to be the oldest existing structure in West Windsor Township, New Jersey. The building was added to the National Register of Historic Places on January 31, 1978.

The home has been listed by Preservation New Jersey on its list of endangered historic sites, as the local and county historical societies disagree about the preservation of the building. The structure was deeded to Mercer County in 1970 when the lands around the house became Mercer County Park. The building was not maintained since it became part of the park; tarps were placed over the roof to protect it from weather. Between 2017 and 2019, the roof of the building was removed and its walls were preserved to create a "constructed ruin" interpretive center.

See also
 National Register of Historic Places listings in Mercer County, New Jersey

References

External links

The John Rogers House - Historical Society of West Windsor

Houses in Mercer County, New Jersey
Houses on the National Register of Historic Places in New Jersey
Houses completed in 1761
National Register of Historic Places in Mercer County, New Jersey
West Windsor, New Jersey